Marie of Luxembourg-Saint-Pol (died 1 April 1547) was a French vassal. She was, as Marie I, the ruling Countess Regnant of Soissons and Saint-Pol in her own right by inheritance from her father between 25 October 1482 and 1 April 1547. She was also Countess consort of Vendôme by marriage to Francis, Count of Vendôme. After the death of her spouse, she was regent of the County of Vendôme as the guardian of her son Charles de Bourbon.

Life
She was the elder daughter and principal heiress of Peter II of Luxembourg, Count of Saint-Pol and Soissons, and Margaret of Savoy, a daughter of Louis I, Duke of Savoy. She belonged to the French, cadet branch of a dynasty which had reigned as Dukes of Luxembourg, and whose senior line provided several Holy Roman Emperors, before becoming extinct in 1437.

She was first married as a child to her maternal uncle, Jacques of Savoy, Count of Romont.  A commander in the army of Charles the Bold, he was deprived of his appanage, the Vaud, by Swiss armies sent by Berne and Fribourg shortly before Marie's prospects as heiress were greatly diminished, following the execution for treason of her grandfather, the French constable Louis de Luxembourg, Count of Saint-Pol in 1475, which entailed the sequestration of his property.
She inherited the County of Soissons and the County of Saint-Pol after the death of her father in 1481. 

Her status and part of her inheritance in France were restored upon her remarriage to Francis de Bourbon, Count of Vendôme, a prince du sang, in 1487. Although she had a younger sister, Francisca of Luxembourg, who wed Philip of Cleves, Lord of Ravenstein, and her father had several younger brothers, she brought vast estates and revenues to the House of Bourbon, including the counties of Saint-Pol and Soissons in Picardy, Ligny, and Marle, as well as the Château de Condé, which was later passed down as a residence to the Princes of Condé who were the descendants of her grandson, Louis de Bourbon, 1st Prince of Condé.

At Francis's death in 1495, she became guardian of their minor son and heir Charles, and managed the lands he inherited from his father as well as her own. She enlarged the Collégiale Saint Georges, rebuilt the Church of Saint Martin, and donated the Porte Saint Georges-aux-Bourgeois-de-Vendôme to become the Mairie.

Her great-granddaughter was crowned Mary, Queen of Scots in 1542. 

She died in 1547 in the château de Fère-en-Tardenois in Picardy, but was buried with her second husband in Vendôme.

Issue
Her daughter by her first marriage, Louise-Françoise of Savoy (d. 1511), died childless after her marriage to Count Henry III of Nassau-Breda. With her second husband Francis, Marie had:
Charles de Bourbon (1489–1537), Duke of Vendôme.
Francis de Bourbon (1491–1545), Count of Saint Pol and Chaumont, and Duke of Estouteville.
Cardinal Louis de Bourbon (1493-1557), Archbishop of Sens.
Antoinette de Bourbon (1493-1583), married Claude, Duke of Guise. 
Louise de Bourbon (1495–1575), Abbess of Fontevrault.

Ancestors

References

Sources

1472 births
1547 deaths
15th-century French nobility
16th-century French nobility
15th-century French women
15th-century French people
16th-century French women
Counts of Soissons
Marie, Countess of Vendome
Soissons, Countess of, Marie of Luxembourg
Princesses of Savoy
15th-century women rulers
16th-century women rulers
Counts of Saint-Pol